These are the results of the women's 200 metres event at the 2006 European Athletics Championships in Gothenburg, Sweden.

Medalists

Schedule

Records 

No records were broken during this event.

Results

Round 1 
Qualification: First 3 in each heat (Q) and the next 4 fastest (q) advance to the semifinals.

Semifinals 
First 4 of each Semifinal will be directly qualified (Q) for the Final.

Semifinal 1

Semifinal 2

Final

References 
 Official results
 Results

Events at the 2006 European Athletics Championships
200 metres at the European Athletics Championships
2006 in women's athletics